The Church of St. John the Evangelist, Sandown is a parish church in the Church of England located in Sandown, Isle of Wight.

Building

The church was built in 1880 and 1881 by the architect Luck. This dramatic building is located at the junction of St. John's Road and Carter Street. It is a very large and high building which seats over 600, and is one of the largest buildings in Sandown. The body of the church includes St. Nicholas's Chapel, a Lady Chapel, and a choir vestry and clergy vestry off the chancel.

Parish status

The church is in a joint parish with Christ Church, Sandown.

Organ

The church has a splendid pipe organ by Henry Willis dating from 1881. A specification of the organ can be found on the National Pipe Organ Register.

References

Church of England church buildings on the Isle of Wight
Grade II listed churches on the Isle of Wight
Sandown